Cho Ki-hyang (born 23 September 1963 in Donghae, Gangwon) is a South Korean former field hockey player who competed in the 1988 Summer Olympics.

Education
Cheongju College of Education (Seowon University)
Mukho Girls' Commercial High School (Donghae Commercial High School)

References

External links
 

1963 births
Living people
South Korean female field hockey players
Olympic field hockey players of South Korea
Field hockey players at the 1988 Summer Olympics
Olympic silver medalists for South Korea
Olympic medalists in field hockey
Sportspeople from Gangwon Province, South Korea
Medalists at the 1988 Summer Olympics
Asian Games medalists in field hockey
Field hockey players at the 1982 Asian Games
Field hockey players at the 1986 Asian Games
Asian Games gold medalists for South Korea
Asian Games silver medalists for South Korea
Medalists at the 1982 Asian Games
Medalists at the 1986 Asian Games
20th-century South Korean women
21st-century South Korean women